Ophiochloa is a genus of Brazilian plants in the grass family.

Ophiochloa is closely related to Axonopus, and some authorities consider the two groups to be a single genus. It is found on serpentine soils in the State of Goiás in central Brazil

 Species
 Ophiochloa bryoides G.H.Rua, R.C.Oliveira & Valls - Goiás
 Ophiochloa hydrolithica Filg., Davidse & Zuloaga -  Goiás

References

Panicoideae
Poaceae genera
Endemic flora of Brazil
Grasses of Brazil
Flora of Goiás